The Borbidge Ministry was a Ministry of the Government of Queensland, led by National Party Premier Rob Borbidge and his deputy, Liberal leader Joan Sheldon. 
It commenced on 19 February 1996 after the Goss Ministry, led by Premier Wayne Goss of the Labor Party, resigned following the loss of the Mundingburra by-election two weeks earlier. The Coalition party leaders were sworn in by the Governor of Queensland as a two-member cabinet. A week later, on 26 February 1996, they resigned so that a full ministry could be sworn in. The Borbidge Ministry was followed by the Beattie Ministry on 26 June 1998 upon the Government's defeat at the 1998 election.

First Ministry
On 26 February 1996, a full ministry of 18 cabinet ministers (consisting of 12 Nationals and 6 Liberals) and 3 parliamentary secretaries was sworn in. It served until the end of the Ministry on 26 June 1998 following the 1998 election.

Blue entries indicate members of the Liberal Party.

References

External links
 All information about ministries was sourced from Ministries from December 1989, extracted from the Queensland Parliamentary Handbook.
 All information about events was sourced from the "Australian Political Chronicle" in various instalments of the Australian Journal of Politics and History.

Queensland ministries
1996 establishments in Australia
1998 disestablishments in Australia